The National Elections Commission (Arabic: الهيئة الوطنية للانتخابات) is the body responsible for managing and supervising the electoral process in Egypt. The Commission is specialized in the presidential, parliamentary and local elections and referendums. The Commission was established in accordance with Law 198 of 2017, as an alternative to the Supreme Elections Committee and the Presidential Election Committee.

References

Government agencies of Egypt
Elections in Egypt
Egypt